Hermann-Bernhard Ramcke (24 January 1889 – 4 July 1968) was a German general of paratroop forces during World War II. He led units in Crete, North Africa, Italy, the Soviet Union and France, and was captured by American forces at the conclusion of the Battle for Brest in September 1944. He was a recipient of the Knight's Cross of the Iron Cross with Oak Leaves, Swords and Diamonds, one of only 27 people in the Nazi German military so decorated.

Ramcke was an ardent Nazi who committed war crimes. Following the fighting on Crete in 1941, he ordered his men to attack civilians. In 1951 Ramcke was convicted of war crimes against French civilians during the Battle of Brest, but was released after three months' imprisonment. During the 1950s he was a prominent nationalist and supported extreme right-wing movements.

World War I
Born in 1889, Ramcke joined the Imperial German Navy in 1905 and served during the First World War. Ramcke fought in the West with the Marine-Infanterie, mainly in the area of Flanders. In 1916 he was decorated with the Iron Cross second class and later the Iron Cross first class. After a defensive action against three British attacks he was decorated with the Prussian Golden Merit Cross, the highest decoration for non-commissioned officers in the German Imperial Forces.

In 1919 Ramcke fought against the Bolshevik forces in the Baltic region as a member of the "Russian Army of the West", composed mostly of German veterans. Ramcke stayed in the Reichswehr during the Weimar Republic period. He continued to serve in the new Wehrmacht, attaining the rank of Oberstleutnant in 1937.

World War II

On 19 July 1940, Ramcke was transferred to the 7th Flieger Division under the command of General Kurt Student and was promoted to Oberst. At the age of 51 he successfully completed the parachute qualification course. In May 1941 working with the division Stab he helped plan and also took part in Operation Merkur, the airborne attack on Crete. Forces under his command captured an airfield which was used to fly in reinforcements. After the costly victory in Crete, remainders of several paratroop units were formed into an ad hoc brigade, and command was given to Ramcke. He was promoted to Generalmajor on 22 July 1941. While on Crete, Ramcke ordered his men to attack civilians in villages where the mutilated bodies of German paratroopers had been found.

In 1942, Ramcke's unit, later known as Ramcke Parachute Brigade, was sent to North Africa to join Rommel's Afrikakorps. The brigade supported the offensive towards the Suez Canal, but when the offensive got bogged down they entered the line at El Alamein. During the withdrawal of the Afrikakorps, the Brigade was surrounded and written off as lost by the high command since it had no organic transport. Rather than surrender, Ramcke led his troops out of the British trap and headed west, losing about 450 men in the process. They soon captured a British supply column that provided not only trucks, but also food, tobacco and other luxuries. About 600 of the paras later rejoined the Afrikakorps in late November 1942. Ramcke was sent back to Germany, where he was awarded the Oak Leaves to the Knights Cross personally by Adolf Hitler.

In 1943 Ramcke, now a generalleutnant, took command of 2nd Parachute Division and transferred to Italy. When Italy signed the armistice with the Allies on 8 September 1943, the division took part in Operation Achse to seize the country. Ramcke led his division in an assault on Italian Army units near Rome, and captured the city two days later. He was badly injured when an Italian aircraft ran his car off the road, and was medically evacuated to Germany.

Also in 1943, Ramcke completed a memoir entitled From Cabin Boy to Paratroop General. The book was published by Franz Eher Nachfolger, the Nazi Party's press, and Minister of Propaganda Joseph Goebbels ordered all German mayors to purchase a copy. A total of 400,000 copies of the book were sold, which considerably enriched Ramcke as well as Hitler, who owned a large share of the publisher.

Ramcke returned to service in mid-February 1944. At this time the 2nd Parachute Division was deployed to the Eastern Front where it was retreating. Ramcke soon fell ill, and returned to Germany on 17 March. He rejoined the division, which was now stationed near Cologne, on 5 or 6 May.

Following the Allied D-Day landings on 6 June, 2nd Parachute Division was sent to the Brittany region of France, and took up defensive positions at Brest. Following Operation Cobra, the allied breakout from Normandy, Major-General Troy H. Middleton's U.S. VIII Corps hooked right from Normandy and attacked the Brittany region. The German forces in the region fell back on Brest, and Ramcke assumed command of the garrison, now known as Festung Brest. Commanding about 30,000 German troops during the Battle for Brest, Ramcke was ordered by Hitler to fight to the last man. He was determined to carry out this order, and justified doing so on the grounds that continuing the resistance at Brest would divert Allied forces away from Germany. Prior to the start of the battle Ramcke evacuated large numbers of French civilians from Brest. Ramcke deployed the paratroopers to strengthen positions held by poorly trained and equipped units, including the 343rd Infantry Division, who made up most of the garrison. He also ordered the destruction of all facilities in Brest which could be used by the Allied forces for any purpose. The Battle for Brest began on 21 August. After heavy fighting, US Army forces pierced Brest's defences by 13 September. On that day Middleton sent Ramcke a letter proposing that he surrender the garrison "with honour", but he rejected the overture. After learning of Ramcke's decision, Middleton instructed his men to "take the Germans apart". Historian Derek R. Mallett has called Ramcke's actions during the Battle of Brest "fanatical".

Most of the surviving German soldiers surrendered on 18 September, but Ramcke attempted to escape from the city. Ramcke led what the US Army official history described as "a group of diehards", which was forced to surrender on 19 September. On the same day he was awarded the Swords (99th Recipient) & Diamonds (20th recipient) to the Knight's Cross. Ramcke's career was unusual in that he served in all three branches of the German armed forces.

Post-war
After being taken prisoner, Ramcke was interrogated by an American officer. During this interrogation he expressed strong support for the Nazi Party, claimed that Germany was a "clean innocent nation greatly wronged by other nations" and that after the war he would prepare his sons to help Germany rise again. The American officer judged that Ramcke was "an egotistical, conceited Nazi" and "a firm believer in Hitler and greatly inclined to the [Nazi] Party". Ramcke was then transferred to the Trent Park facility for captured senior German officers in London. The British officers who ran the facility also considered him to be one of the most vocal supporters of the Nazi Party they had encountered. A report prepared on Ramcke stated that "if there [was] to be such a thing as a list of especially dangerous men to be kept under surveillance [after the war], General Ramcke ought to qualify as one of the first candidates". While at Trent Park, Ramcke boasted about destroying Brest in a conversation with Dietrich von Choltitz, the last commander of German-occupied Paris. Von Choltitz believed that Ramcke's actions constituted a war crime.

Ramcke was later moved to the United States as a prisoner of war. On 1 January 1946 he briefly escaped from Camp Clinton, Mississippi to post letters protesting about American propaganda campaigns and the withdrawal of tobacco and other luxury items from the POWs to Byron Price, the director of the Office for Censorship, and Senator James Eastland. After the camp authorities learned of Ramcke's escape, he was transferred to Camp Shelby in Mississippi and held in solitary confinement on a diet of bread and water for four days.

Ramcke was returned to Europe in March 1946. After a brief period in Belgium, he was transferred to the London Cage. Historian Helen Fry has written that he was considered at this time to be a "bombastic nasty man who sought to blame others for the crimes of the regime". During his interrogation at the London Cage Ramcke retracted claims that New Zealand soldiers, including Māori personnel, had committed atrocities during the fighting on Crete which were contained in the book of memoirs he had written while in American custody. Ramcke was later transferred to a camp at Lüneburg and gave evidence in Student's war crimes trial. He was greatly angered when Student was convicted.

From 1946 Ramcke was held in French custody awaiting trial for war crimes relating to the fighting at Brest. The crimes he was charged with included the execution of French civilians, the looting of civilian property and the intentional destruction of civilian houses. After being held in custody for 57 months he escaped to Germany to see his family, but surrendered himself soon afterwards. Following a trial, he was found guilty on 21 March 1951, and sentenced to five years and six months' imprisonment. He was released after three months' imprisonment either on account of his age or due to having already been held in French captivity for five years before the verdict.

Following his release from nearly seven years captivity, Ramcke, through his public actions, became seen as a dedicated nationalist by his fellow generals and supported extreme right-wing movements such as the Naumann-Kreis in Germany. During an address to a meeting of the German paratrooper veterans' association in July 1951, Ramcke criticised what he claimed was Allied defamation of former German soldiers, and called for the release of "so-called war criminals". At a rally of SS veterans in October 1952 Ramcke gave a lengthy speech critical of the western Allies, during which he claimed that they were the real war criminals.

In November 1952, Ramcke told a group of former SS men attending a HIAG meeting they should be proud of being blacklisted, while stating that in the future their blacklist would instead be seen as a "list of honor". Ramcke's remarks caused a furor in Germany; even the former SS General Felix Steiner distanced himself from them. Konrad Adenauer was so furious with Ramcke's remarks that he directed Thomas Dehler, the German federal Minister of Justice, to investigate the possibility of prosecuting Ramcke. Adenauer publicly described Ramcke's remarks as "irresponsible" and his associated behavior as "foolishness"—a reaction probably prompted because Adenauer's government had made a significant effort to obtain early release for Ramcke from French imprisonment.

Ramcke and his supporters argued that the intent of his actions following the war was to again seek to protect his men, both in their reputations and their future, such as in cautioning against their being used as "cannon fodder" in the speech to ex-paratroopers during the rearmament debate. This was consistent with his behavior throughout his military career. Ramcke published two autobiographies, one during the war and the other in 1951. He died in 1968.

Awards
 Prussian Iron Cross of 1914 2nd Class on 17 April 1916 & 1st Class on 27 January 1917
 Prussian Golden Military Merit Cross on 24 April 1918
 Clasp to the Iron Cross of 1939 2nd Class on 1 October 1939 & 1st Class on 23 May 1941
 Knight's Cross of the Iron Cross with Oak Leaves, Swords and Diamonds
 Knight's Cross on 21 August 1941 as Oberst and commander of the Fallschirmjäger-Sturm-Regiment
 145th Oak Leaves on 13 November 1942 as Generalmajor and commander of Fallschirmjäger-Brigade "Ramcke"
 99th Swords on 19 September 1944 as General der Fallschirmtruppe and commander of Fortress Brest
 20th Diamonds on 19 September 1944 as General der Fallschirmtruppe and commander of Fortress Brest

Works
 Vom Ritterkreuzträger zum Angeklagten. Nation-Europa-Verlag, Coburg 2001. .
 Fallschirmjäger. Schütz, Preußisch Oldendorf 1973.
 Fallschirmjäger, damals und danach. Lorch, Frankfurt am Main 1951.
 Vom Schiffsjungen zum Fallschirmjäger-General. Verlag Die Wehrmacht, Berlin 1943.

Notes

References

Citations

Bibliography

  (link to pdf)
 Frei, Norbert (2002). Adenauer's Germany and the Nazi past: the politics of amnesty and integration. New York: Columbia University Press. .

External links

 Ramcke's letter to Byron Price
 

1889 births
1968 deaths
People from Schleswig, Schleswig-Holstein
People from the Province of Schleswig-Holstein
Luftwaffe World War II generals
German military writers
German prisoners of war in World War II held by the United States
Generals of Parachute Troops
Recipients of the Silver Medal of Military Valor
Recipients of the Knight's Cross of the Iron Cross with Oak Leaves, Swords and Diamonds
Recipients of the clasp to the Iron Cross, 1st class
Deaths from cancer in Germany
German prisoners of war in World War II held by the United Kingdom
German prisoners of war in World War II held by France
Imperial German Navy personnel of World War I
German male non-fiction writers
20th-century Freikorps personnel
Luftwaffe personnel convicted of war crimes
Military personnel from Schleswig-Holstein